Michael Eugene "Tony" Davis (born January 21, 1953) is a former  American football running back in the National Football League. Davis played both I-back and fullback for new head coach Tom Osborne at the University of Nebraska-Lincoln.

From Tecumseh, Nebraska, southeast of Lincoln, Davis was Osborne's first 1,000-yard rusher (as a sophomore in 1973) and left as the Cornhuskers' all-time leading rusher. He was the Most Valuable Player in two of college football's major bowl games in the same calendar year (1974); the Cotton Bowl win over the Texas Longhorns (19–3) on New Year's Day as a sophomore, and Sugar Bowl win on New Year's Eve over the Florida Gators (13–10). He was elected to the Nebraska Sports Hall of Fame in 1989.
 
In the 1976 NFL Draft, Davis was selected in the fourth round (106th overall) by the Cincinnati Bengals. He played six seasons in the NFL, three each for the Bengals (1976–1978) and Tampa Bay Buccaneers (1979–1981). In his second year in 1977, Davis was the Bengals' team MVP, selected by a vote of players and fans. He also played one season (1983) for the Boston Breakers of the USFL.

Since his retirement as a player, Davis has worked as a football assistant at Nebraska, coached high school football in Colorado, and now works in business development in the oil & gas industry. Currently, he is an advocate who works in communication with Congress to address issues prevalent to retired NFL players.

External links
Nebraska Cornhuskers –  Tony Davis 
Sports Reference – collegiate statistics
Nebraska High School Sports Hall of Fame – Tony Davis

1953 births
Living people
People from Tecumseh, Nebraska
Players of American football from Nebraska
American football running backs
Nebraska Cornhuskers football players
Cincinnati Bengals players
Tampa Bay Buccaneers players